Renato Cinquini was an Italian film editor. He worked on more than a hundred films during his career.

Selected filmography
 Figaro Here, Figaro There (1950)
 Son of d'Artagnan (1950)
 Toto Looks for a Wife (1950)
 Brief Rapture (1951)
 The Dream of Zorro (1952)
 The Unfaithfuls (1953)
 Neapolitan Turk (1953)
 Two Nights with Cleopatra (1954)
 Poverty and Nobility (1954)
 A Woman Alone (1956)
 The Mighty Crusaders (1958)
 The Loves of Hercules (1960)
 Totò, Peppino e... la dolce vita (1961)
 Nefertiti, Queen of the Nile (1961)
 Thor and the Amazon Women (1963)
 The Fall of Rome (1963)
 The Whip and the Body (1963)
 The Sign of the Coyote (1963)
 Three Nights of Love (1964)
 Nightmare Castle (1965)
 A Bullet for the General (1966)
 Argoman the Fantastic Superman (1967)
 The Belle Starr Story (1968)
 The Vampire and the Ballerina (1968)
 Hell in Normandy (1968)
 The Ruthless Four (1968)
 Day After Tomorrow (1968)
 Shoot Twice (1969)
 1870 (1971)
 Eye in the Labyrinth (1972)
 Il domestico (1974)
 Sex Pot (1975)
 Bloody Payroll (1976)
 La malavita attacca... la polizia risponde! (1977)
 Pane, burro e marmellata (1977)

References

Bibliography 
 Roberto Curti. Italian Gothic Horror Films, 1957-1969. McFarland, 2015.

External links 
 

Year of birth unknown
Year of death unknown
Italian film editors